Eastport Municipal Airport  is a city-owned public-use airport located one nautical mile (1.85 km) west of the central business district of Eastport, a city  in Washington County, Maine, United States.

Although most U.S. airports use the same three-letter location identifier for the FAA and IATA, this airport is assigned EPM by the FAA but has no designation from the IATA.

On October 13, 2020, the airport announced in a ceremony that it had received a $5.2 million grant from the U.S. Federal Aviation Administration. The grant will be used to build a new runway and improve lighting and infrastructure. Expected completion date of the new runway is late 2021. The airport also announced that it will be applying for a federal small airport development grant and that it is in active discussions with Cape Air for future non-stop service to Boston Logan International Airport.

Facilities and aircraft 
It has one runway designated 15/33 with an asphalt surface measuring 4,000 by 75 feet (1,219 x 23 m).

For the 12-month period ending August 13, 2008, the airport had 1,200 general aviation aircraft operations, an average of 100 per month. At that time there were 5 aircraft based at this airport: 80% single-engine and 20% ultralight.

References

External links 
 Aerial photo as of 15 May 1996 from USGS The National Map
 
 

Airports in Washington County, Maine
Buildings and structures in Eastport, Maine